Vijay Chendoor is an Indian actor and writer who works in Kannada-language films.

Career 
Vijay Chendoor worked as a writer for the film Rocky (2008) before making his acting debut with Swayam Krushi (2011). Yash, whom he worked with in Rocky, recommended that Chendoor star in his film Lucky (2012). He garnered recognition for his role as Thigne in the horror film 6-5=2 (2013). Regarding his role in the horror film Karvva (2016), a critic noted that "Tilak as the rich brat, Rohith as the smart conman and Vijay Chandour as the entertaining dubbing artiste ensure they keep the audience hooked with their performances". He went on to star in Humble Politician Nograj (2018) as Nograj's peon Manjunath. One critic stated that "One of the best points about the film is the combination of Nograj and Monjunath — Danish Sait and Vijay Chendoor. The chemistry and timing that the two share is commendable".

Filmography

As a writer 
Rocky (2008)
Swayam Krushi (2011)

As an actor 
All films are in Kannada, unless otherwise noted.

Awards and nominations

References

External links 

Male actors from Karnataka
Indian male film actors
Living people
Male actors in Kannada cinema
21st-century Indian male actors
Year of birth missing (living people)